The Mull of Kintyre Lighthouse on Mull of Kintyre was the second lighthouse commissioned in Scotland by the Commissioners of the Northern Lights. It was designed and built by Thomas Smith and completed in 1788. Smith had previously designed the light at Kinnaird Head, but Mull of Kintyre was a far more substantial project, in a far more remote location.

The lighthouse was rebuilt in the 1820s. The light was fixed until 1906, when it was converted to flashing, and its power increased from 8,000 to 281,000 candelas. It was converted to electrical power in 1976, automated in 1996 and is now monitored from Edinburgh.

The former keeper's cottages are now run as holiday cottages by the National Trust for Scotland.

See also
 List of lighthouses in Scotland
 List of Northern Lighthouse Board lighthouses

References

External links
 Northern Lighthouse Board

Kintyre
Category A listed lighthouses
Lighthouses in Scotland